List of works by Vincent van Gogh is an incomplete list of paintings and other works by the Dutch artist Vincent van Gogh (1853–1890).
Little appreciated during his lifetime, his fame grew in the years after his death. According to the legend, Van Gogh sold only one painting, The Red Vineyard, bought for 400 francs by the painter and art collector Anna Boch. Today, he is widely regarded as one of history's greatest painters and an important contributor to the foundations of modern art. Van Gogh did not begin painting until his late twenties, and most of his best-known works were produced during his final two years. He produced more than 2,000 artworks, consisting of around 900 paintings and 1,100 drawings and sketches. In 2013, Sunset at Montmajour became the first full-sized Van Gogh painting to be newly confirmed since 1928.

Today many of his pieces—including his numerous self portraits, landscapes, portraits and sunflowers—are among the world's most recognizable and expensive works of art. On March 30, 1987, Irises was sold for a record US$53.9 million at Sotheby's; on May 15, 1990, his Portrait of Dr. Gachet was sold for US$82.5 million at Christie's, establishing a new price record until exceeded in 2004 by a Picasso painting.

The Van Gogh Museum in Amsterdam is dedicated to Van Gogh's work and that of his contemporaries. The Kröller-Müller Museum in Otterlo (also in the Netherlands), has another considerable collection of his paintings. The listing is ordered by year and then by catalogue number. While more accurate dating of Van Gogh's work is often difficult, as a general rule, the numbering from Jan Hulsker's catalogue is more precise chronologically.

Paintings (The Hague-Drenthe)
All works listed here are oil on canvas unless otherwise indicated.

Paintings (Nuenen-Antwerp)

Paintings (Paris)

Paintings (Arles)

Paintings (Saint-Rémy)

Paintings (Auvers-sur-Oise)

Watercolours

Drawings
Van Gogh made more than a thousand drawings during his lifetime.

Prints (Lithographs)

Prints (Etchings)

Letter sketches

See also
 Almond Blossoms (Van Gogh series): Four paintings of blossoming almond trees or branches made in Arles or Saint-Remy
 Agostina Segatori Sitting in the Café du Tambourin: Parisian influences, Japanese wood block prints
 Asnières (Van Gogh series): Paris 1887, a group of paintings made in Asnières, a northwest suburb of Paris including parks, restaurants, the river Seine and factories.  This work represents the significant transformation that Van Gogh's artwork took starting the spring of 1887
 Butterflies (Van Gogh series): Five paintings of butterflies made in Arles and Saint-Remy
 Copies by Vincent van Gogh: Paintings made in Saint-Remy of works by Millet, Delacroix, Rembrandt and others
 Early works of Vincent van Gogh - Etten, The Hague: Van Gogh's works from 1881 and 1882
 Flowering Orchards (Van Gogh series): Arles, expanded and provided references for an article about flowering trees and orchards made in 1888
 Hospital in Arles (Van Gogh series): paintings of the hospital garden and a sick ward
 Langlois Bridge at Arles (Van Gogh series): Arles, combination of new influences and those of Holland
 Le Moulin de la Galette (Van Gogh series): Montmartre, windmill paintings named Le Moulin de la Galette
 Montmarte (Van Gogh series): Paris, Montmartre area where Van Gogh lived with his brother, Theo
 Old Church Tower at Nuenen ('The Peasants' Churchyard'): Nuenen
 Olive Trees (Van Gogh series) of 16 paintings: Saint-Remy, spiritual significance, complement to The Starry Night
 Outskirts of Paris (Van Gogh): Paris
 Paintings of Children (Van Gogh series) of 30 paintings: changes over 10 years work, interest in portraits, desire to comfort
 Peasant Character Studies (Van Gogh series)
 The Roulin Family (Van Gogh series): Arles, interaction and support by Roulin family
 Saint-Paul Asylum, Saint-Rémy (Van Gogh series) is a collection of paintings that Van Gogh made of the asylum grounds or from his window in the asylum.  It includes paintings of the interior, the enclosed wheat field he painted from his cell and a number of paintings of the garden grounds, trees and flowers.  There are also three portraits.
 Seine (Van Gogh series): Paris, paintings along the Seine in Paris, Clichy, and Asnières.  Section showing samples of Holland work and background information about Haussmann renovations throughout the article.
 Still life paintings by Vincent van Gogh (Netherlands)
 Still life paintings by Vincent van Gogh (Paris)
 Still Life: Vase with Pink Roses: Paris, color theory, color fading (especially the pink/reds)
 Trees and Undergrowth (Van Gogh series)
 Van Gogh's family in his art
 Vase with Red Poppies: Paris, one of Van Gogh's many still lifes of flowers painted in Paris
 The Wheat Field: paintings of the enclosed wheat field visible from Van Gogh's room at Saint-Paul asylum
 Wheat Fields (Van Gogh series) of 48 paintings, not all of which have public domain images: changes over 10 years, spiritual significance, color, insight into his time at Saint-Paul, peasant genre, desire to comfort, blazing sun, desire to work as hard as the laborers.

Notes

Citations

Sources

The Vincent van Gogh Gallery. The Paintings: A-Z Listings. Retrieved 11 August 2006.
Van Gogh Virtual Museum. Museum Painting List. Retrieved 11 August 2006.

+
 
Paintings of the Netherlands by Vincent van Gogh
Paintings of Paris by Vincent van Gogh
Paintings of Arles by Vincent van Gogh
Paintings of Saint-Rémy-de-Provence by Vincent van Gogh
Gogh